Midfield is an unincorporated community in Matagorda County, Texas, United States. Midfield has a post office with the ZIP code 77458. It is also part of the Tidehaven Independent School District.

The designated community college for Tidehaven ISD is Wharton County Junior College.

References

External links
 

Unincorporated communities in Matagorda County, Texas
Unincorporated communities in Texas